Pedro Henrique Parreira Alves Caipiro (born 14 January 1987) is a Portuguese football player.

Club career
He made his professional debut in the Segunda Liga for Atlético CP on 11 August 2013 in a game against Sporting B.

References

1987 births
People from Loures
Living people
Portuguese footballers
Association football defenders
GS Loures players
Clube Oriental de Lisboa players
C.D. Pinhalnovense players
CD Operário players
C.D. Fátima players
Atlético Clube de Portugal players
Liga Portugal 2 players
S.U. Sintrense players
C.D. Mafra players
Sportspeople from Lisbon District